The National Museum of Transylvanian History is a history and archaeology museum in the city of Cluj-Napoca, Romania. It features a permanent exhibition, as well as temporary exhibitions, the "Tezaur" exhibition, and Pharmacy Historical collection—this last opened in the Hintz House, an historical building in the city's center.

The beginnings of the museum date back to 1859 with the foundation of the Society of the Transylvanian Museum, featuring collections of antiquities and botanical, zoological and mineralogical specimens. In 1929 the collection of artefacts was transferred to the Romanian Institute of Classical Studies. After several further movements, caused by lack of space, the collection was reopened in 1937 at its current site in Piaţa Muzeului (Constantin Daicoviciu street), in the center of Cluj-Napoca.

Permanent collection
The permanent collection is organized in chronological order.

Prehistory

The longest period in the history of mankind, developing from times when the writing was still unknown. Chronologically it stretches from Paleolithic, Neolithic, Bronze Age to Iron Age. The National Museum of Transylvanian History offers a vast collection of Iclod culture, Petrești culture, Wietenberg culture and Noua culture. It hosts the biggest hoard bronze artifacts in Europe.

Wietenberg Culture Artifacts

Dacian Ages in Transylvania
 The Dacian collection present a rich collection of artifacts, including weaponry.

Roman Times of Dacia

Medieval Times

Modern times

Egyptian Collection

Lapidarium

Treasury

See also 
 Museums in Cluj-Napoca
 Prehistory of Transylvania

External links

 Museum website 
 Museum website 
  

Museums established in 1859
Culture of Transylvania
History of Cluj-Napoca
History museums in Romania
Museums in Cluj-Napoca
Archaeological museums in Romania
Museums of Dacia
Treasure troves
1859 establishments in the Austrian Empire